The 1973 CONCACAF Championship, the sixth edition of the CONCACAF Championship, was held in Haiti from 29 November to 18 December. All matches were played at Stade Sylvio Cator in Port-au-Prince. This is the first edition to double as qualification for the World Cup. Haiti became winners for the first time in the CONCACAF region and qualified for West Germany '74. The North, Central American and Caribbean zone was allocated 1 place (out of 16) in the World Cup.

Qualification

Venues

Results

Haiti qualified for the 1974 FIFA World Cup.

Goalscorers
7 goals

 Steve David

5 goals

 Emmanuel Sanon

4 goals

 Octavio Muciño

3 goals

 Rubén Guifarro
 Horacio López Salgado

2 goals

 Everald Cummings

1 goal

 Juan Banegas
 Benjamín Monterroso
 René Morales
 Jorge Roldán
 Jean-Claude Désir
 Guy Saint-Vil
 Roger Saint-Vil
 Jorge Alberto Bran Guevara
 Óscar Rolando Hernández
 Roberto Soza
 Enrique Borja
 Manuel Lapuente
 Héctor Pulido
 Rignald Alfonso Clemencia
 Adelbert Toppenberg
 Siegfried Schoop
 Erroll Maximino St. Jago
 Warren Archibald

1 own goal

 Siegfried Brunken (playing against Trinidad and Tobago)

See also
1974 FIFA World Cup qualification
1974 FIFA World Cup qualification (CONMEBOL)
1974 FIFA World Cup qualification (CAF)
1974 FIFA World Cup qualification (AFC and OFC)
1974 FIFA World Cup qualification (UEFA)

References

 
CONCACAF
1973
1973
1973–74 in Honduran football
1973–74 in Guatemalan football
1973–74 in Costa Rican football
1973–74 in Mexican football
1973
1973 in Haiti
November 1973 sports events in North America
20th century in Port-au-Prince
Events in Port-au-Prince
Sport in Port-au-Prince